Sir Thomas de Somerville of Linton and Carnwarth, (c.1245-1300) was a 13th-14th century Scottish noble. He was Baron of Linton.

Thomas was the son of Sir William de Somerville.

He swore fealty and homage to King Edward I of England on 15 May 1296 at Roxburgh. During 1297 he joined Sir William Wallace in rebellion.

Family
Thomas had the following known issue:
Walter, who married Giles, daughter of Sir John Herring.
John, executed at Newcastle upon Tweed on 4 August 1306.

Citations

References
Burke, Bernard. A Genealogical History of the Dormant, Abeyant, Forfeited, and Extinct Peerages of the British Empire, new edition (1883; reprint, Baltimore, Maryland: Genealogical Publishing Company, 1978)
Douglas, Robert. The peerage of Scotland: containing an historical and genealogical account of the nobility of that kingdom, ... collected from the public records, and ancient chartularies of this nation, ... Illustrated with copper-plates.

1300 deaths
13th-century Scottish people
14th-century Scottish people
Medieval Scottish knights
Scottish people of the Wars of Scottish Independence